The Spanish Air and Space Force (SASF) is the aerial and space warfare branch of the Spanish Armed Forces.

History

Early stages

Hot air balloons have been used with military purposes in Spain as far back as 1896. In 1905, with the help of Alfredo Kindelán, Leonardo Torres y Quevedo directed the construction of the first Spanish dirigible in the Army Military Aerostatics Service, created in 1896 and located in Guadalajara. The new airship was completed successfully and, named 'España', made numerous test and exhibition flights.

The Spanish Army's air arm, however, took off formally in 1909 when Colonel Pedro Vives Vich and Captain Alfredo Kindelán made an official trip to different European cities to check the potential of introducing airships and airplanes in the Spanish Armed Forces. One year later a Royal decree established the National Aviation School in Getafe, near Madrid, under the Ministry of Public Works and Transport.

Captain Alfredo Kindelán was named Chief of Aviation, .

On 17 December 1913, during the war with Morocco, a Spanish expeditionary squadron of the  became the first organized military air unit to see combat during the first systematic bombing in history by dropping aerial bombs from a Lohner Flecha (Arrow) airplane on the plain of Ben Karrix in Morocco. During the years that followed, most of the military activity of the Spanish Air Force would take place in Northern Morocco.

In 1915 Spain's first seaplane base was opened at Los Alcazares on the Mar Menor in the Murcia region and Alfredo Kindelán was named Military Aeronautics Director, displacing Pedro Vives. The Catalan Flying School was established in Can Tunis, Barcelona the following year and Getafe Aerodrome became a full-fledged military air base.

In 1920 two Nieuport 80 and one Caudron G.3 were first painted with squadron identification numbers and the Spanish Air Force roundel.

Lieutenant Colonel Kindelán was named , becoming chief-commander of the air force in 1926, at the time when Spanish Morocco was retaken and the Rif War ended.

In 1926 a crew of Spanish aviators, that included Ramón Franco, Julio Ruiz de Alda, Juan Manuel Duran and Pablo Rada, completed the first Trans-Atlantic flight between Spain and South America in January 1926 on the Plus Ultra. That same year, pilots González Gallarza, Joaquín Loriga Taboada and Rafael Martínez Esteve completed the first flight between Spain and the Philippines, in just one month.

In 1930 the Aeronaval Base in San Javier was established and in the same year a pro-Republican revolt in the Cuatro Vientos military aerodrome near Madrid was quashed. After the proclamation of the Second Spanish Republic in 1931, General Luis Lombarte Serrano replaced Kindelán as chief-commander of the air force, but he would be quickly succeeded by Commander Ramón Franco, younger brother of later dictator Francisco Franco. Captain Cipriano Rodríguez Díaz and Lieutenant Carlos de Haya González flew non-stop to Equatorial Guinea, then a Spanish colonial outpost. Under Capitan Warlela cadastral surveys of Spain were carried out using modern methods of aerial photography in 1933. The following year Spanish engineer Juan de la Cierva took off and landed on seaplane carrier Dédalo with his autogyro C-30P. In 1934 Commander Eduardo Sáenz de Buruaga became new chief-commander of the air force.

Accordingly, the Spanish Navy-based  model was replaced by divisions which are still operative today.

Air warfare in the Spanish Civil War
After the military rebellion that triggered the Spanish Civil War, Spanish military aviation was divided into the Air Force of the Spanish republican government and the National Aviation, established by the army in revolt.

In July 1936, right after the coup, the first German Junkers Ju 52 and Italian Savoia-Marchetti SM.81 arrived to help the rebels and the Fiat CR.32 fighters began operating in the Córdoba front. In August Heinkel He 51 fighters were also deployed. These planes helped the army in revolt to gain full control of the air, as did the German and Italian expeditionary forces, the Condor Legion and the Aviazione Legionaria. At first, the Spanish Republican Air Force had the control of great swathes of Spanish territory using a motley selection of planes, but the unwavering help received by Francisco Franco from Nazi Germany and Fascist Italy reversed the situation. In September 1936 the Navy and Air Ministry, and the Air Undersecretariat,  were established under the command of Indalecio Prieto as minister. The first serious air combat took place over Madrid when Italian bombers attacked the city in a massive bombing operation. The Republican tricolor roundel was replaced by red bands for identification purposes, an insignia that had previously been used on Aeronáutica Naval aircraft during the monarchy in the 1920s, before the time of the Republic.

Many innovative, and often lethal, aeronautical bombing techniques were tested by Germany's Condor Legion forces on Spanish soil against the areas that remained loyal to the Republican Government with the permission of Generalísimo Franco. Nazi help to the Nationalist Air Force was part of Hitler's German re-armament strategy and the techniques that German Nazi pilots learned in Spain would later be used in World War II. Despite the devastation and the human casualties caused by the bombing of the Basque city of Guernica in 1937, known by the Luftwaffe as Operation Rügen, Hitler insisted that his longterm designs in Spain were peaceful. He called his strategy "Blumenkrieg" (Flower War), as evidenced in a January 1937 speech. The international outcry over Guernica, however, would not bring about any increase in the military help provided to the beleaguered Spanish Republic.The pilots of the Spanish Republican Air Force, often young and poorly trained were unable to check the Nazi German and Fascist Italian modern-warfare attacks. Despite Franco's claim that both air forces were equal, and despite the help of foreign pilots, Spanish Republican planes were mostly obsolete and often in a bad state of disrepair. Even after acquiring more planes from the Soviet Union in the mid-stages of the war, the Spanish Republican Air Force was no longer able to control the Spanish skies nor match the power of the German and Italian expeditionary forces in specific combat situations.

The Spanish Republican Air Force became practically irrelevant since the Battle of the Ebro in 1938 when the root of the Spanish Republican Armed Forces was broken. Finally it was completely disbanded after the victory on April 1, 1939.

Post-Civil War era

The present Spanish Air Force (or EdA) was officially established on 7 October 1939, after the end of the Spanish Civil War. The EdA was a successor to the Nationalist and Republican Air Forces. Spanish Republican colors disappeared and the black roundel of the planes was replaced by a yellow and red roundel. However, the black and white Saint Andrew's Cross fin flash, the tail insignia of Franco's air force, as well as of the Aviazione Legionaria of Fascist Italy and the Condor Legion of Nazi Germany, is still in use in the present-day Spanish Air Force.

After the changes introduced at the beginning of Franco's regime the Air Regions and their Command centres were the following:
 1st Air Region. Central.
2nd Air Region. Straits.
 3rd Air Region. East.
 4th Air Region. Pyrenees.
5th Air Region. Atlantic.
 Balearic Islands Air Zone
 Morocco Air Zone
 Canary Islands and East Africa Air Zone

The Blue Squadron was an air unit that fought alongside the Axis Powers at the time of the Blue Division, Division Azul Spanish volunteer formation in World War II. The  operated with the Luftwaffe on the Eastern Front and took part in the battle of Kursk. This squadron was the ""/JG 27 Afrika of the VIII Fliegerkorps, Luftflotte 2.

During the first years after World War II the Spanish Air Force consisted largely of German and Italian planes and copies of them. An interesting example was the HA-1112-M1L Buchón (Pouter), this was essentially a licensed production of the Messerschmitt Bf 109 re-engined with a Rolls-Royce Merlin 500-45 for use in Spain.

It first saw action in the Ifni War during 1957 and 1958. Because of US Government objection to use airplanes manufactured in the US in her colonial struggles after World War II, Spain used at first old German aircraft, such as the T-2 (Junkers 52, nicknamed "Pava"), the B-2I (Heinkel 111, nicknamed "Pedro"), the C-4K (Spanish version of the Bf 109, nicknamed "Buchón"), and some others. Still, Grumman Albatross seaplanes and Sikorsky H-19B helicopters were used in rescue operations. This is why still now in present times, EdA maintains a policy of having jet fighters from two different origins, one first line fighter of North American origin, and one from French-European origin (F-4C Phantom / Mirage F1, Mirage III; EF-18A / Eurofighter Typhoon).

Although in sheer numbers the EdA was impressive, at the end of World War II technically it had become more or less obsolete due to the progress in aviation technology during the war. For budget reasons Spain actually kept many of the old German aircraft operative well into the 1950s and 1960s. As an example the last Junkers Ju 52 used to operate in Escuadrón 721 training parachutists from Alcantarilla Air Base near Murcia, until well into the 1970s. The CASA 352 and the CASA 352L were developments built by CASA in the 1950s.

Links were established in the 1950s with the United States. Spain received its first jets, like the F-86 Sabre and Lockheed T-33 together with training and transport planes like the T-6 Texan, C-47 and C-54, and the Beechcraft T-34 Mentor. The first series of American jets was replaced in the 1960s by newer fighters like the F-104 Starfighter, F-4C Phantom and F-5 Freedom Fighter

Present times 

After the death of dictator Franco in 1975 and the ensuing Spanish transition to democracy years, the organization and equipment of the Spanish Air Force was again modernised to prepare for Spain's membership of NATO in 1982. Planes like the Mirage III and Mirage F1 were bought from France and became the backbone of the Air Force during the 1970s and part of the 1980s. French fighters formed the air force's mainstay until the arrival of the American F/A-18. Spanish F/A-18s participated in the Bosnian War and the Kosovo War under NATO command, based in Aviano, Italy. Assisted by USAF F-16s, Spanish Air Force EF-18As dropped laser-guided bombs on Bosnian Serb ammunition depots at Pale, on 25 and 26 May 1994.

The Spanish Air and Space Force is replacing older aircraft in the inventory with newer ones including Eurofighter Typhoon and the recently introduced Airbus A400M Atlas airlifter. Both are manufactured with Spanish participation; EADS CASA makes the Eurofighter's right wing and leading edge slats, and participates in the testing and assembly of the airlifter.

Unlike the air forces of most major NATO member states, the Spanish Air and Space Force currently do not operate any AEW&C aircraft.

Its aerobatic display team is the Patrulla Aguila, which flies the CASA C-101 Aviojet. Its helicopter display team, Patrulla Aspa, flies the Eurocopter EC-120 Colibrí.

In July 2014 the Spanish Air Force joined the European Air Transport Command, headquartered at Eindhoven Airbase in the Netherlands.

The Spanish Government announced in June 2022 that the Spanish Air Force would be renamed as the Spanish Air and Space Force.

Order of battle

The basic organization of the Air and Space Force is the following:
 Chief of Staff of the Air and Space Force (JEMAE)
 Air and Space Force Headquarters (CGEAE) in Madrid
 Combat Air Command (MACOM) at Torrejón Air Base
 General Air Command (MAGEN) in Madrid
 Canary Islands Air Command (MACAN) in Las Palmas
 Logistic Support command (MALOG) in Madrid
 Personnel Command (MAPER) in Madrid
 Economic Affairs Directorate (DAE) in Madrid

Force structure
An operations group is normally composed of two or three  (squadrons), each one normally consisting of 18 to 24 aircraft. Thus, Ala 15, with its base in Zaragoza Air Base, is formed by two squadrons with 18 F/A-18s each. The  completes the typical wing structure and it is the air base group, providing the functioning of the air base as a military installation. The  operates Eurofighter aircraft in the multi-mission fighter role, while the  operates P-3 Orion aircraft in the maritime patrol and ASW role and correspondingly there are two separate maintenance squadrons for the two aircraft types.

Smaller operational units are the separate groups. They are also army regiment equivalents, but unlike the wings they are composite units, in which the operational aircraft, the maintenance and the air base squadrons report directly to the group.

When an air base houses more than one  or multiple separate , the function of a lodger unit is provided by an air force installation unit (an army regiment equivalent) called Groupment of the ... Air Force Base. An  could be responsible for the support of air force operations at more than one airfield (military or civilian). As an example the Groupment of the Zaragoza Air Force Base is responsible for the mixed use military / civilian airfields of Zaragoza, Logroño-Agoncillo and Huesca-Pirineos.

Air bases

Alcantarilla Air Base
Armilla Air Base
Cuatro Vientos Air Base
Gando Air Base
Getafe Air Base
Los Llanos Air Base
Matacán Air Base
Morón Air Base
San Javier Air Base
Santiago Air Base
Son San Joan Air Base
Talavera Air Base
Torrejón Air Base
Villanubla Air Base
Zaragoza Air Base

Defunct air bases

Agoncillo Air Base
Manises Air Base
Reus Air Base
Villafría Air Base

Aircraft

Current inventory

Aircraft identification

The Spanish Air and Space Force has its own alphanumeric system for identifying aircraft. This forms a prefix to the airframe serial number, usually marked on the tail. The letter or letters, correspond to the use given. Thus, C means  (fighter bomber); A,  (attack); P,  (patrol); T,  (transport); E,  (training); D, search and rescue; H, helicopter; K, tanker; V, Vertical Take Off and Landing (VTOL); and U, utility. An example would be that the F/A-18 with "C.15-08" on the tail is the fifteenth type of fighter that arrived in the Spanish Air and Space Force (the Eurofighter is the C.16) and is the eighth example of this type to enter the SAF. On the nose or fuselage the aircraft has a numeral specific to the unit in which it is based.

Variants of planes in service, for example two-seater versions or tanker versions of transports planes, add another letter to differentiate their function, and have their own sequence of serial numbers separate from the primary versions. Example: "CE.15-02" will be the second F/A-18 two-seater (Fighter Trainer) delivered to the SAF. In addition, the aircraft used by the Spanish Air and Space Force usually carry a code consisting of one or two digits followed by a dash and two numbers, painted on the nose or fuselage. The first number corresponds to the unit to which they belong, and the second the order in which they entered service.  Example: the fourth F/A-18 arriving at Ala 12 will have on the nose the code "12-04". Those codes do change when the aircraft is re-allocated to a different unit.

Ranks

Officers

Non-commissioned officers and enlisted rank insignia

Spanish air aces

Spanish Civil War

Joaquín García-Morato y Castaño
Julio Salvador Díaz-Benjumea
Manuel Vázquez Sagastizábal
Arístides García-López Rengel
Miguel Zambudio Martínez
Ángel Salas Larrazábal
Miguel García Pardo
Andrés García Calle
Manuel Aguirre López
Joaquín Velasco Fernández Nespral
Carlos Bayo Alessandri
Manuel Zarauza Clavero
Juan Lario
Javier Allende Isasi
Esteban Ibarreche Arriaga
Felipe del Rio Crespo
Emilio O'Connor Valdivielso
José Larios Fernández
José María Bravo Fernández-Hermosa
Leopoldo Morquillas Rubio

World War II

Vicente Aldecoa Lecanda
Dámaso Arango López
Luis Azqueta Brunet
Vicente Beltrán
Fernando Bengoa Cremades
Mariano Cuadra Medina
Lorenzo Lucas Fernández Peña
José Ramón Gavilán Ponce de León
Antonio García Cano
Juan Lario Sánchez
José Luis Larrañaga
Ángel Salas Larrazábal
José Mateos Recio
Bernardo Meneses Orozco
Francisco Meroño Pellicer
José Pascual Santamaría
Fernando Sánchez Arjona Courtoy
Manuel Sánchez-Tabernero de Prada
Francisco Valiente Zárraga
Manuel Zarauza Claver

See also
 Aviazione Legionaria
 Bombing of Guernica
 Condor Legion
 German re-armament
 Patrulla Águila
 List of F-104 Starfighter operators
 Museo del Aire
 Emblems of the Spanish Air and Space Force
 Spanish Air and Space Force Anthem
 Spanish Air Force Order of Battle
 Spanish Civil War
 Spanish Republican Air Force

Notes

References

Bibliography

External links

 Home page of the Spanish Air and Space Force
 Foro Militar General (Spanish military forum)
Aerial Warfare and the Spanish Civil War

 
Military units and formations established in 1939
1939 establishments in Spain